The extreme points of Bulgaria include the coordinates that are further north, south, east or west than any other location in Bulgaria; and the highest and the lowest elevations in the country. This list excludes Bulgaria's station in Antarctica. With the exception of Cape Shabla, the easternmost location of Bulgaria, all other extreme points are uninhabited.

The latitude and longitude are expressed in decimal degree notation, in which a positive latitude value refers to the northern hemisphere, and a negative value refers to the southern hemisphere. Similarly, a positive longitude value refers to the eastern hemisphere, and a negative value refers to the western hemisphere. The coordinates used in this article are sourced from Google Earth, which makes use of the World Geodetic System (WGS) 84, a geodetic reference system.

Latitude and longitude

Bulgaria's northernmost point is where the Timok River flows into the Danube. The northern tip of Bulgaria is located in the Vidin Province, and neighbours the Mehedinți County of Romania. The closest Bulgarian village to that area is Vrav. Bulgaria's most southern point is in the Kardzhali Province's Mount Veykata. At , Veykata is the highest Bulgarian peak of the Gyumyurdzhinski Snezhnik ridge in the Eastern Rhodope Mountains, and borders the East Macedonia and Thrace periphery of Greece. Bulgaria's westernmost point is in Vrashka chuka saddle. This is the point where the Vidin Province borders both the Zaječar District of Southern and Eastern Serbia. Cape Shabla is Bulgaria's easternmost point; it lies in the Dobrich Province, on the country's Black Sea outlet. This table excludes St. Kliment Ohridski Base, Bulgaria's station in Antarctica.

Extreme elevation

Musala is part of the Rila mountain range in the Sofia Province. In addition to being Bulgaria's highest point, Musala is also taller than any other peak in the Balkans. Bulgaria's lowest point is located on the coast, with its outlet on the Black Sea. The region stays steady at sea level, and stretches , from the Romanian Black Sea Riviera to Turkey's Marmara Region.

See also
 Extreme points of Europe
 Extreme points of Earth
 Geography of Bulgaria

Notes

References

Bulgaria
Extreme